The Times Square–42nd Street/Port Authority Bus Terminal station is a major New York City Subway station complex located under Times Square and the Port Authority Bus Terminal, at the intersection of 42nd Street, Seventh and Eighth Avenues and Broadway in Midtown Manhattan. The complex allows free transfers between the IRT 42nd Street Shuttle, the BMT Broadway Line, the IRT Broadway–Seventh Avenue Line and the IRT Flushing Line, with a long transfer to the IND Eighth Avenue Line one block west at 42nd Street–Port Authority Bus Terminal. The complex is served by the 1, 2, 3, 7, A, E, N and Q trains at all times, the W train during weekdays, the C, R and 42nd Street Shuttle (S) trains at all times except late nights, and by <7> trains during rush hours in the peak direction.

The present shuttle platforms were built for the Interborough Rapid Transit Company (IRT) as a local station on the city's first subway line, which was approved in 1900. The station opened on October 27, 1904, as one of the original 28 stations of the New York City Subway. As part of the Dual Contracts between the IRT and the Brooklyn–Manhattan Transit Corporation (BMT), the Broadway–Seventh Avenue Line platforms opened in 1917, followed by the Broadway Line platforms in 1918 and the Flushing Line platforms in 1928. The original platforms were also reconfigured to serve the shuttle. The Eighth Avenue Line platforms opened in 1932 as part of the Independent Subway System (IND). The complex has been reconstructed numerous times over the years. The free transfer between the IRT and BMT opened in 1948 while the transfer to the IND opened in 1988. The complex, excluding the IND station, was placed on the National Register of Historic Places in 2004. In the early 21st century, the shuttle station was reconfigured.

Excluding closed platforms, the Flushing Line and shuttle stations have one island platform and two tracks, while the Broadway Line, Broadway–Seventh Avenue Line and Eighth Avenue Line stations have two island platforms and four tracks. All platforms and most of the station complex is compliant with the Americans with Disabilities Act of 1990, except for the IND passageway. The Times Square–42nd Street complex is the busiest station complex in the system, serving 65,020,294 passengers in 2019.



History 

The IRT platforms have been connected to each other as a transfer station as the lines opened: first between the 42nd Street Shuttle and the Broadway–Seventh Avenue Line in 1917, then the transfer was incorporated with the Flushing Line in 1927. On December 24, 1932, a  passageway was opened, connecting the IND Eighth Avenue Line station and the IRT platforms, with a new entrance at West 41st Street between Seventh Avenue and Eighth Avenue. The passageway was located outside a fare control, and passengers had to pay an extra fare to transfer between the IND and the IRT station. The free transfer between the IRT and BMT was added on July 1, 1948. The block-long passageway that runs west to the 42nd Street–Port Authority Bus Terminal station on the IND Eighth Avenue Line was reopened within fare control on December 11, 1988.

First subway 

Planning for a subway line in New York City dates to 1864. Development of what would become the city's first subway line started in 1894, when the New York State Legislature authorized the Rapid Transit Act. The subway plans were drawn up by a team of engineers led by William Barclay Parsons, chief engineer of the Rapid Transit Commission. It called for a subway line from New York City Hall in lower Manhattan to the Upper West Side, where two branches would lead north into the Bronx. A plan was formally adopted in 1897, which called for the subway to run under several streets in lower Manhattan before running under Fourth Avenue, 42nd Street, and Broadway. A previous proposal had called for the entire length of the subway to use Broadway, but the "awkward alignment...along Forty-Second Street", as the commission put it, was necessitated by objections to using the southernmost section of Broadway. Legal challenges were resolved near the end of 1899. The Rapid Transit Construction Company, organized by John B. McDonald and funded by August Belmont Jr., signed the initial Contract 1 with the Rapid Transit Commission in February 1900, in which it would construct the subway and maintain a 50-year operating lease from the opening of the line. In 1901, the firm of Heins & LaFarge was hired to design the underground stations. Belmont incorporated the Interborough Rapid Transit Company (IRT) in April 1902 to operate the subway.

The present shuttle station at Times Square–42nd Street was constructed as part of the route segment underneath 42nd Street and Times Square, which extended from Park Avenue and 41st Street to Broadway and 47th Street. Construction on this section of the line began on February 25, 1901. Work for that section had been awarded to Degnon-McLean. By late 1903, the subway was nearly complete, but the IRT Powerhouse and the system's electrical substations were still under construction, delaying the system's opening. The Times Square–42nd Street station opened on October 27, 1904, as one of the original 28 stations of the New York City Subway from City Hall to 145th Street on the West Side Branch.

Prior to the subway station's opening, Times Square had been renamed from Long Acre Square to give the station a distinctive name. Within three years of the line's opening, the Times Square station was the city's third-busiest subway station, and its busiest local station, with 30,000 daily riders. After the first subway line was completed in 1908, the station was served by local trains along both the West Side (now the Broadway–Seventh Avenue Line to Van Cortlandt Park–242nd Street) and East Side (now the Lenox Avenue Line). West Side local trains had their southern terminus at City Hall during rush hours and South Ferry at other times, and had their northern terminus at 242nd Street. East Side local trains ran from City Hall to Lenox Avenue (145th Street).

Expansion
To address overcrowding, in 1909, the New York Public Service Commission (PSC) proposed lengthening platforms at stations along the original IRT subway. As part of a modification to the IRT's construction contracts, made on January 18, 1910, the company was to lengthen station platforms to accommodate ten-car express and six-car local trains. In addition to $1.5 million (equivalent to $ million in ) spent on platform lengthening, $500,000 was spent on building additional entrances and exits. It was anticipated that these improvements would increase capacity by 25 percent. The northbound platform was extended to the north and south, while the southbound platform was lengthened to the south, necessitating a reconfiguration of the Knickerbocker Hotel entrance.

Dual Contracts 
The Dual Contracts were formalized in March 1913, specifying new lines or expansions to be built by the IRT and the Brooklyn Rapid Transit Company (BRT). As part of the Dual Contracts, the Public Service Commission planned to split the original IRT system into three segments: two north–south lines, carrying through trains over the Lexington Avenue and Broadway–Seventh Avenue Lines, and a west–east shuttle under 42nd Street. This would form a roughly "H"-shaped system. The original alignment under 42nd Street would become a shuttle service, and a new set of platforms would be built for the Broadway–Seventh Avenue Line.

IRT "H" system 
In December 1913, the PSC began soliciting bids for the construction of the Seventh Avenue Line tunnel between 42nd and 30th Streets, including two express stations at 34th and 42nd Streets. The new IRT line was to cross the original subway tunnel at a flat junction near 45th Street, necessitating that the new station be placed between 40th and 42nd Streets. The PSC awarded a $2.2 million contract to an IRT subsidiary, and the Board of Estimate approved the contract the next month. 

The next contract to be awarded was for the section between 42nd and 44th Streets. The Oscar Daniels Company submitted a low bid for the construction of that section, Despite protests from IRT officials, who said their bid was more expensive because it included additional safety measures, the commission refused to re-award the contract to the IRT. The construction of the new junction included rebuilding the roof, moving pillars, and demolishing part of the original subway tunnel's wall. The new tunnel had been excavated northward to the existing IRT line by June 1915, and workers were laying tracks for the new tunnel by 1916.

The Broadway–Seventh Avenue Line station opened on June 3, 1917, as part of an extension of the IRT to South Ferry. A shuttle service ran between Times Square and Penn Station until the rest of the extension opened a year later on July 1, 1918. Afterward, the shuttle ran from Times Square to South Ferry. On August 1, the Dual Contracts' "H system" was put into service, and the former main line platforms became part of the 42nd Street Shuttle. Initially, a temporary wooden platform was placed over track 2 of the original subway, and black bands were painted on the walls to guide passengers to the shuttle platforms.

The Broadway–Seventh Avenue Line station was the site of a 1928 wreck that killed 16 people, the second worst in New York City history (the worst being the Malbone Street Wreck in Brooklyn, which killed at least 93).

BRT platforms 
Also planned under the Dual Contracts was the Broadway Line of the Brooklyn Rapid Transit Company (BRT), subsequently the Brooklyn–Manhattan Transit Corporation (BMT). The Broadway Line station was planned as a local station, with the express station to be located between 47th and 49th Streets. Opponents of the plan said it would cause large amounts of confusion, as Times Square was a "natural" transfer point. In February 1914, the PSC ordered the BRT to make the Broadway Line's 42nd Street station an express station. The change was made at the insistence of Brooklynites who wanted an express station in the Theater District of Manhattan.  

The BRT station was to have two small mezzanines above the platforms, one each at 40th and 42nd Streets, but local civic group Broadway Association advocated for a connection between the two mezzanines. The PSC approved the construction of a large concourse above the BRT station in 1917. The concourse would only have cost an extra $1,400, but the station's general contractor refused to build the concourse because of a dispute over the price of cast-iron columns. The Broadway Line station opened on January 5, 1918, as the northern terminal of a shuttle service running south to Rector Street. Through service began operating in July 1919 when the line was extended northward.

Flushing Line 
The Dual Contracts also included completing and opening the Steinway Tunnel as part of the new Flushing subway line. The tunnel, running under the East River with trolley loops on both the Manhattan and Queens sides, had sat unused since 1907, when test runs had been performed in the then-nearly-complete tunnel. The route, traveling under 41st and 42nd Streets in Manhattan, was to go from Times Square through the tunnel over to Long Island City and from there continue toward Flushing. The section of the tunnel between Grand Central–42nd Street and Queens had opened on June 22, 1915.

In July 1920, the PSC announced it would extend the Flushing Line two stops west to Times Square, with an intermediate station under Bryant Park. On November 9, 1921, the New York State Transit Commission opened up the contract for the extension for bidding. The extension would take a slightly different route than the one specified in the Dual Contracts. The original proposal had the line constructed under 42nd Street to a point just to the east of Broadway, which would have forced riders transferring to the IRT Broadway–Seventh Avenue Line to walk a long distance.

The Times Square station would be designed at a lower level than the two existing stations at Times Square. It would have two upper mezzanines connected by passageways: a mezzanine east of Seventh Avenue extending to Broadway, and one west of Seventh Avenue. Escalators would connect these upper mezzanines with the lower mezzanine, and a provision would be made to permit the installation of an escalator to the east of Seventh Avenue. There would be two entrances at street level at each of the western corners of 41st Street and Broadway, and two entrances at the northeastern corner of 41st Street and Seventh Avenue. The project was expected to reduce crowding on the 42nd Street Shuttle by enabling riders to use the Queensboro Subway to directly access Times Square. 24,000 of the estimated 100,000 daily shuttle riders transferred to and from the Queensboro Subway. The line was to extend as far as Eighth Avenue to connect with the proposed IND Eighth Avenue Line.

On November 22, 1921, the Powers-Kennedy Contracting Corporation was awarded a contract to construct the extension on a low bid of $3,867,138, below the estimated cost of over $4 million. This low bid was the narrowest margin ever recorded for any large city contract, beating out the next highest bidder by 0.7 percent. While the contractor was provided four years to complete work, engineers expected to reduce the time needed to do so to as little as three years. Since work on the project had to be completed underneath the foundations of several large buildings, such as theatres, and the north end of the New York Public Library, the contractor had to provide a $1 million bond. Powers-Kennedy started excavating the line westward from Grand Central in May 1922. The Flushing Line extension was to run beneath the original line from Vanderbilt to Fifth Avenue. The contractors had completed the tunnels to Fifth Avenue by May 1923, and the Fifth Avenue station opened on March 22, 1926, as the temporary western terminus of the line. In fall 1926, it was announced that the line would be completed by January 1, 1927.

In June 1926, the Ascher Company was awarded a contract to complete the Flushing Line's Times Square station. On February 8, 1927, the New York City Board of Transportation informed the New York State Transit Commission that work on the Times Square station was sufficiently completed to enable the start of train service beginning on February 19, 1927, with the completion of work to a point between Eighth Avenue and Seventh Avenue. Plans for the construction of an extension of the line to between Eighth Avenue and Ninth Avenue to provide a physical connection with the IND Eighth Avenue Line were underway. On March 1, 1927, the opening of the line was set for March 15, the third time an opening date was set for the line. Work had been postponed given the amount of work that remained to be completed. The opening of the line was about a year behind the April 29, 1926, date specified in the contract. The delay was the result of surprisingly difficult construction. The Board of Transportation had withheld retained percentages, as allowed in the contract, penalizing the contractor, and trying to incentivize it to speed up work. No retained percentages were provided to the contractor until February 1927. The Flushing Line was extended to Times Square on March 14, 1927.

Independent Subway System 
As early as March 1918, soon after the BMT Broadway Line opened to Times Square–42nd Street, plans were being considered for an extension of that line beyond the stubs at 57th Street–Seventh Avenue to the Upper West Side and Washington Heights via Central Park West (Eighth Avenue). On August 3, 1923, the New York City Board of Estimate approved the Washington Heights Line, an extension of the Broadway Line to Washington Heights. The line was to have four tracks from Central Park West at 64th Street under Central Park West, Eighth Avenue, Saint Nicholas Avenue, and private property to 173rd Street, and two tracks under Fort Washington Avenue to 193rd Street. South of 64th Street, one two-track line would connect to the Broadway Line stubs at 57th Street, and another would continue under Eighth Avenue to 30th Street at Penn Station, with provisions to continue downtown.

Mayor John Hylan instead wanted to build an independent subway system, operated by the city. The New York City Board of Transportation (NYCBOT) gave preliminary approval to several lines in Manhattan, including one on Eighth Avenue, on December 9, 1924. The main portion of the already-approved Washington Heights Line—the mostly-four track line north of 64th Street—was included, but was to continue north from 193rd Street to 207th Street. South of 64th Street, the plan called for four tracks in Eighth Avenue, Greenwich Avenue, the planned extension of Sixth Avenue, and Church Street. Two tracks would turn east under Fulton Street or Wall Street and under the East River to Downtown Brooklyn.

A groundbreaking ceremony was held at St. Nicholas Avenue and 123rd Street on March 14, 1925. Most of the Eighth Avenue Line was dug using a cheap cut-and-cover method, where the street above was excavated. Neighboring buildings, such as the Times Square Hotel and the Franklin Savings Bank at 42nd Street, had to be underpinned because the station extended all the way to the property line on either side. Several workers died in cave-ins during construction.

The IND's 42nd Street station was substantially completed by December 1930 except for some interior finishes. The Eighth Avenue Line station opened on September 10, 1932, as part of the city-operated Independent Subway System (IND)'s initial segment, between Chambers Street and 207th Street. At the time of the IND Eighth Avenue Line's completion, the New York Herald Tribune referred to the line's 42nd Street station as the "largest platform in the world". The line's opening was expected to spur development around the intersection of 42nd Street and Eighth Avenue. A pedestrian passageway under 41st Street, connecting the IND station at 42nd Street with the IRT and BMT stations at Times Square, opened on December 24, 1932; the passageway included an entrance on 41st Street between Seventh and Eighth Avenues. Passengers had to pay an additional fare to transfer to and from the IND.

Mid-20th century

1930s to 1950s 
In Fiscal Year 1937, the express-track side of the southbound Broadway–Seventh Avenue platform was extended  to the south to provide ample space at the center door of ten-car trains. In addition, the IRT opened a new entrance to the northwestern corner of Seventh Avenue and 42nd Street through the Rialto Building, on the site of the Rialto Theatre.

The city government took over the BMT's operations on June 1, 1940. At midnight, a ceremony commemorating the transfer, with five hundred people in attendance, was held at the Times Square station. The last BMT train had left the 57th Street station five minutes earlier. When the train arrived at Times Square, BMT president William S. Menden handed over his company's properties to Mayor Fiorello H. LaGuardia, who then gave them to New York City Board of Transportation chairman John H. Delaney. The city government then took over the IRT's operations on June 12, 1940. The Board of Transportation operated the New York City transit system until the creation of the New York City Transit Authority in 1953.

With the construction of the Port Authority Bus Terminal, in September 1950, the Board of Transportation approved the construction of a  ramp between the Eighth Avenue Line station and the bus terminal for $100,000. The IND's lower level was built together with the upper-level platforms but existed as an unfinished shell. The city approved a $300.000 renovation of the lower level in June 1952, and the lower level opened on August 25, 1952, to serve rush hour E trains. For most of its existence, the lower-level platform was only used for occasional service specials, including summer "Rockaway Special" trains to Beach 98th Street at the Rockaways' Playland beginning in 1958, the Aqueduct Racetrack special fare trains from 1959 to 1981, and rush hour E trains in the 1970s, beginning on March 23, 1970.

The Flushing Line platforms at Times Square, as well as platforms at all other stations on the Flushing Line with the exception of Queensboro Plaza, were extended in 1955–1956 to accommodate 11-car trains. One of the complex's entrances on 43rd Street was closed in 1957 to make way for a Times Square visitor center. This entrance was rebuilt next to the information center after numerous protests, and it reopened in July 1958.

1960s to 1980s 
A new entrance at the southwest corner of Seventh Avenue and 42nd Street opened in 1964, and a shopping arcade within the basement of the Rialto Building was closed in July 1967. The BMT station received a minor overhaul in the late 1970s when the MTA fixed the station's structure and the overall appearance, and it repaired staircases and platform edges, removed pedestrian ramps, and replaced lighting.

By the 1970s, city officials planned to raise funds for a renovation of the Times Square station complex, using sales-tax revenue from materials used in the construction of the New York Marriott Marquis hotel. As part of a pilot program to reduce high crime in the New York City Subway system, in May 1981, the MTA spent $500,000 to install CCTV screens at the Columbus Circle subway station. The MTA expanded the experiment to the Times Square–42nd Street station in 1983. The cameras were deactivated in 1985 after further tests showed that their presence did not help reduce crime. The MTA considered transferring 220 CCTV cameras from these stations to token booths at the stations with the most crime. On August 1, 1988, the passageway between the IND Eighth Avenue Line station and the IRT/BMT complex was finally placed within fare control. The two previously-separate stations had the highest crime rates in the system at the time.

Late 20th and early 21st centuries 
The Empire State Development Corporation (ESDC), an agency of the New York state government, had proposed redeveloping the area around a portion of West 42nd Street in 1981. As part of the redevelopment, in 1988, the state and NYCTA announced that they would spend $125 million on renovating the Times Square subway complex. The project would have included an underground rotunda with stores, connecting several office buildings; new subway entrances inside these buildings; and elevators. The project excluded renovation of the platforms or the passageway under 41st Street. Park Tower Realty, which had committed to developing four buildings in the redevelopment, would have paid for 60 percent of the project's cost, while the New York City Transit Authority would have provided $45 million and the city would have provided $10 million. The project was canceled in August 1992 after Prudential Insurance and Park Tower Realty was given permission to postpone the construction of these buildings.

The station underwent total reconstruction in stages starting in 1994. Phase 1 rebuilt the Broadway–Seventh Avenue Line platforms with a new mezzanine, stairs, and elevators, and was completed in 2002. Phase 2, finished in 2006, rebuilt the Broadway Line, Flushing Line, and Eighth Avenue Line portions of the station.

Phase 1 and 2 renovation 
In 1995, the MTA announced it would build a main entrance on the south side of 42nd Street between Seventh Avenue and Broadway. The site of the new entrance was occupied at the time by an "interim" retail space. Originally, the MTA had proposed consolidating 11 separate entrances to the complex into one full-time main entrance and four part-time entrances. The new main entrance opened in July 1997. It features a bright neon and colored glass flashing sign with train route symbols and the word "Subway", as well as an elevator and escalators.

In July 1998, the MTA started accepting bids for the renovation of the Times Square station. The first phase would include renovating the Broadway–Seventh Avenue Line platforms, part of the Broadway Line platforms, and the mezzanine, while the second phase would cover the rest of the station. The goal was to reduce congestion and improve rider access, comfort and safety by improving visual lines and increasing pedestrian capacity. The main corridor would be widened  and the number of sharp corners would be reduced. In addition, there would be new elevators to make the station compliant with the for Americans with Disabilities Act of 1990, new escalators, and wider corridors and stairs. William Nicholas Bodouva & Associates designed the materials for the renovation. Slattery Skanska, a firm owned by Slattery Associates and Skanska, received an $82.8 million contract for the station's renovation in December 1998. Bovis Lend Lease and CTE Engineers served as construction managers for the first two phases of the project.

The renovation of the complex began when the entrances at the northwest and southwest corners of 42nd Street and Seventh Avenue were temporarily closed in May 1999. New entrances were added on the northwest and southwest corners of Seventh Avenue and 42nd Street. The southwest-corner entrance at 5 Times Square has both escalators and stairs. The northwest-corner entrance in 3 Times Square only has stairs because the MTA allowed the building's developer Rudin Management to pay $1.3 million instead of adding two escalators.

The second phase cost $91 million. The cost of renovating the station had exceeded $257.3 million by 2004. The mezzanine above the BMT Broadway Line, which formerly housed a record shop named Record Mart, was renovated with a large oval balcony looking over the trackway. In 2004, four unisex stall bathrooms were opened on the mezzanine between the IRT and BMT lines; they are staffed and maintained by employees of the Times Square Alliance, the local Business Improvement District. Record Mart reopened in 2007 on the south side of the IRT/BMT corridor, and when it closed permanently in 2020, it had been Manhattan's oldest operating record store.

Phase 3 renovation 
During the third phase of the station's renovation, the shuttle platform would have been relocated , and a new island platform for the shuttle would have been created. By 2004, the work was planned to be completed in 2006 at a cost of $85 million. Although planning had been completed in 2006, the project was delayed due to a lack of funding. As part of the 2015–2019 Capital Program, the MTA scheduled some improvements to make it accessible under the guidelines of the Americans with Disabilities Act of 1990. The 42nd Street Shuttle became ADA-accessible, the shuttle was reconfigured from three tracks to two tracks, and the trains became six cars long. The whole project was expected to cost $235.41 million.

The entire Times Square station was rehabilitated with congestion mitigation measures. A wider stairway was installed from the shuttle mezzanine to street level, and a new control area was installed at the bottom of the stairway. The cost of this part of the project is $30 million. In conjunction, a second project added access to the Times Square complex. As part of the project, the eastern platform was closed to public access, and the exit to 43rd Street was closed, covered over, and turned into an emergency exit, starting on October 19, 2019. The staircase would lead from the shuttle mezzanine to street level, blocking portions of the station's original finishes. A new control area would be installed at the bottom of the stairway. To further increase capacity, 21 columns were eliminated; other columns at the station were thinned, requiring the underpinning of roof beams; and 142 columns in the concourse area were relocated away from the car doors. The cost of this project was estimated to be $28.93 million.

The new control area provided an additional 5,000 square feet in mezzanine space, while the new entrance provided an additional 450 square feet of space. The entrance's canopy has 238 triangular glass frames that replicate the crystals part of the New Year's Eve Crystal Ball. Eighteen new CCTV cameras, ten new turnstiles, two emergency exit gates, and four new digital information screens were installed in the new control area. Two new mosaics by Nick Cave, titled "Equal All" and "Each One", were installed as part of the project.

The northern section of the original west platform wall dating from 1904 was removed, and One Times Square's owner Jamestown Properties built elevators connecting the station to the street. The wall was broken into sections and moved to the New York Transit Museum to mitigate the adverse effects of the station renovation. To further mitigate damage done to portions of the original station, certain features were repaired and restored, including the original southwest platform and control area wall finishes, the original cast iron columns, the ceiling plaster ornamentation, and the cast iron guard rails. In addition, the east platform walls that were located within back-of-house space were protected. The damaged Knickerbocker marble lintel located at the west platform control area were replicated. To reference portions of the original tracks located at tracks 2 and 3, the granite paving for the shuttle platform was modified with a veneer steel rail. Finally, a plaque describing the history of the station was installed underneath the replicated Knickerbocker lintel.

The construction contract for the project was originally scheduled to be awarded in June 2018. This was delayed by several months because of changes to the project schedule and cost. The construction duration was expected to be extended by three months, and the cost would increase by $25 million, because of additions to the original construction plan. A construction contract was awarded in March 2019, with an estimated completion date of March 2022. The shuttle was temporarily closed in mid-2020 for this work. The new platform opened on September 7, 2021, along with the passageway to the 42nd Street–Bryant Park station. This made the shuttle station ADA-accessible; though the passageway was not yet accessible, elevators were planned for its Bryant Park end. The new $40 million station entrance, including the new elevator, formally opened on May 16, 2022. The MTA spent $30 million to construct the new staircase entrance and Jamestown paid $10 million for the elevator.

Other modifications 
In the late 2000s, the MTA began construction on an extension of the IRT Flushing Line to 34th Street, which would require demolishing the IND Eighth Avenue lower level platform. By January 2010, the lower level platform was being demolished as part of the Flushing Line extension, which slopes down through where the old lower level platform was. On September 13, 2015, the Flushing Line was extended one stop west from Times Square to 34th Street–Hudson Yards.

In February 2022, the MTA announced that the IRT Flushing Line platforms would receive platform screen doors as part of a pilot program. The announcement came after several people had been shoved onto tracks, including one incident that led to the death of Michelle Go on the BMT platform. The MTA started soliciting bids from platform-door manufacturers in mid-2022; the doors are planned to be installed starting in April 2023 at a cost of $6 million.

Bombings and terrorist plots
A bombing at the station on October 12, 1960, injured 33 passengers. In September 2009, Najibullah Zazi and alleged co-conspirators planned suicide bombings on subway trains near this station and the Grand Central–42nd Street station, but the plot was discovered before they could carry it out. There was also a bombing on December 11, 2017, during the morning rush hour, when a pipe bomb device partially detonated in the 41st Street passageway.

Station layout

Times Square was named for The New York Times. The Times headquarters, built by Times owner Adolph S. Ochs, housed the original subway station (now the shuttle platforms) in its basement.

Five separate stations comprise the Times Square complex. The IRT Broadway–Seventh Avenue Line station runs  under Seventh Avenue and is parallel to the IND Eighth Avenue Line platforms. The BMT Broadway Line station runs in a true north–south alignment  under Broadway. The Times Square–42nd Street and 42nd Street–Port Authority Bus Terminal stations are both fully wheelchair-accessible. The ramp between the two parts of the complex is ADA-uncompliant.

Mezzanines 
There are several mezzanines throughout the complex, connected by several ramps and stairs. The primary, upper mezzanine is near the level of the shuttle platforms and consists of four passageways in a trapezoidal layout, arranged under 42nd Street, Broadway, 41st Street, and Seventh Avenue. An oval-shaped cut is on the Broadway side of the main mezzanine, below which are the northern ends of the BMT platforms. A pair of escalators to the Flushing Line is at the southwestern corner of this mezzanine. Some parts of the mezzanine have glass-tiled walls, while other parts are clad with white ceramic tile topped by mosaic bands. "Music Under New York" controls various spots within the mezzanine for performers.

Near the south end of the BMT platforms, there is a smaller mezzanine overhead, which leads to exits at 40th Street.

Under the IRT Broadway–Seventh Avenue Line platforms, but above the Flushing Line platforms, is a lower mezzanine level extending from west to east. This mezzanine connects to a steep ramp that leads to the passageway to the IND Eighth Avenue Line platforms. A 600-foot-long passageway under 41st Street connects the IND station with the rest of the complex. The passageway is located above the mezzanines at either end. It is stair-free but contains steep ramps at both ends, which are not ADA-compliant.

The IND mezzanine stretches above the IND platforms, under Eighth Avenue, from 40th to 44th Street. It was one of four large mezzanines at express stations on the Eighth Avenue Line where passengers could walk the entire length of the mezzanines without having to pay a fare. It was proposed to develop the mezzanines of these four stations with shops, so that they would become retail corridors. The station's mezzanine extends four blocks from 40th to 44th Streets. There were originally six stairs from the mezzanine to either of the IND's island platforms. The center of the mezzanine originally featured an  public passageway outside fare control. Between 44th and 42nd Streets, the passageway was flanked by stores on the west and stairs to the northbound platform on the east. Between 42nd and 40th Streets, the stairs to the southbound island platform were on the west, while there were stores to the east.

Exits
From the Eighth Avenue portion of the complex, there is one street stair to each of the northwest, northeast, and southeast corners of Eighth Avenue and 40th Street. There are two underground passageways to Port Authority Bus Terminal: one between 40th and 41st Streets, and a wheelchair accessible passageway between 41st and 42nd Streets. At the intersection of Eighth Avenue and 42nd Street, there is one street stair to the northwest corner, one stair inside a building on the northeast corner, and one escalator bank inside a building on the southeast corner. One street stair leads to the southwest corner of Eighth Avenue and 43rd Street. Finally, there is one street stair to each of the northwest, southwest, and southeast corners of Eighth Avenue and 44th Street. The southwest-corner entrance also has a wheelchair lift that leads to an elevator. All of these exits are closest to the Eighth Avenue Line platforms and are signed as serving the A, C, E, and 7 trains.

From the Times Square portion of the complex, several exits are signed as serving most or all of the services in the complex. There are two exits inside buildings on 42nd Street west of Seventh Avenue: the north side within 3 Times Square and the south side within 5 Times Square. On the south side of 42nd Street between Seventh Avenue and Broadway, there is an elevator and escalator bank inside the Times Square Tower. The street level fare control at this site features restored original "Times Square" mosaics from the Contract I station walls (now used by the shuttle). One street stair rises to the southeast corner of Broadway and 42nd Street. A block to the south, one stair goes into a building at the northeast corner of 41st Street and Seventh Avenue, and two street stairs go to the southeast corner. An exit-only stair rises to the southwest corner of 41st Street and Broadway.

Two sets of exits on 40th Street are separate from the main mezzanine areas and are signed as only serving certain services. At 40th Street and Seventh Avenue, one stair goes into a building at the southwest corner, and one street stair goes to the southeast corner. These serve a mezzanine above the Broadway–Seventh Avenue Line platforms and are signed as serving the 1, 2, 3, 7, and S trains. One street stair rises to each of the corners of 40th Street and Broadway, serving the southern mezzanine above the Broadway Line platforms. Those entrances are signed as serving the N, Q, R, W, and S trains.

There are several closed exits throughout the station complex. Until 1981, there was a stair to the southeastern corner of 41st Street and 8th Avenue. Another stair rose to the south side of 41st Street between Seventh and Eighth Avenues in the passageway between the Eighth Avenue Line station and the rest of the station complex, and was closed in 1989 due to very low usage. A street stair to the northeastern corner of 42nd Street and Seventh Avenue, by One Times Square, was closed around 1998–2000. Two stairs to the northeastern corner of 41st Street and Seventh Avenue were closed during the same time, as were stairs to both western corners of that intersection. In 2019, a stair to the southwestern corner of 43rd Street and Broadway was closed as part of the shuttle modernization project. Many of the station's entrances were historically constructed within other buildings.

IRT 42nd Street Shuttle platform 

The Times Square station on the 42nd Street Shuttle consists of an island platform between tracks 1 and 4, which was completed in 2021. At the east end of the platform is a passageway to the 42nd Street–Bryant Park station, running between tracks 1 and 4.

The island platform replaced a layout dating from the original IRT subway, completed in 1904. It was originally a four-track local stop with two side platforms outside the local tracks. Most of the wall along the side platform for track 1 was removed in 1914 to provide a connection to the new Times Square station on the IRT Broadway–Seventh Avenue Line. An underpass formerly connected the original side platforms. In 1918, the southbound express track (formerly track 2) was removed and replaced by a temporary wooden platform for access to the original northbound express track (formerly track 3). Track 3's wooden platform was subsequently replaced by a more permanent platform, while the old local platforms still served tracks 1 and 4. Track 3 was taken out of service on November 7, 2020, and was replaced with the island platform. The old platforms were connected on the west (railroad north) side. A movable walkway crossed track 4, the former northbound local track; the walkway could be temporarily removed to allow access to and from that track. Because of the curvature on the platforms, gap fillers under the platforms were used on tracks 1 and 3. These two platforms were concave and curved toward the shuttle trains. Track 4 did not have gap fillers because of the convex curve of the platform, curving away from the shuttle trains.

Design
As with other stations built as part of the original IRT, the station was constructed using a cut-and-cover method. The tunnel is covered by a "U"-shaped trough that contains utility pipes and wires. Each platform consists of  concrete slabs, beneath which are drainage basins. The platform next to track 1 contain circular Doric columns spaced every . Prior to the 2019–2022 reconstruction, there were additional columns between the tracks and on track 3's platform, spaced every , which supported the jack-arched concrete station roofs. The renovation removed or relocated many of these columns so they are spaced at wider intervals, and an island platform was built atop tracks 2 and 3. There is a  gap between the trough wall and the platform walls, which are made of -thick brick covered over by a tiled finish.

The original decorative scheme for the side platforms consisted of blue tile station-name tablets, blue and pink tile bands, multicolored tile pilasters, a buff faience cornice, and buff faience plaques. The mosaic tiles at all original IRT stations were manufactured by the American Encaustic Tile Company, which subcontracted the installations at each station. The decorative work was performed by faience contractor Grueby Faience Company. The former southbound local platform (serving track 1) still has a vestiges of a doorway to the Knickerbocker Hotel, while the former northbound local platform (which once served track 4) retains a former doorway to the Times Building. Small sections of the original wall remained before the station's reconstruction, with brick wainscoting capped by a marble band and white tiles.

Track layout
North of the station, track 4 merges into the northbound IRT Broadway–Seventh Avenue Line local track along the original subway alignment, north of the current Broadway–Seventh Avenue Line station. The other three tracks once curved parallel to this. Track 1 ends at a bumper block at the west end of the platform. Track 3 originally also ended at a bumper block at the west end of its platform. There is no track connection between track 4 and the other tracks anywhere along the shuttle.

BMT Broadway Line platforms 

The Times Square–42nd Street station on the BMT Broadway Line is an express station, with four tracks and two island platforms. The N and Q trains stop here at all times. The R stops here at all times except late nights, while the W stops here during weekdays. Two stairs and one elevator from each platform ascend to the primary mezzanine. At the far south end of each platform, two stairs ascend to the southern BMT mezzanine. Near the center of the southbound platform, a set of stairs rises to the 41st Street corridor of the primary mezzanine.

The tunnel is covered by a "U"-shaped trough that contains utility pipes and wires. Each platform consists of  concrete slabs, beneath which are drainage basins. The platforms contain I-beam columns spaced every . Additional columns between the tracks, spaced every , support the jack-arched concrete station roofs. The panels on the trackside walls consist of white square ceramic tiles. A frieze with multicolored geometric patterns runs atop the trackside walls, and a plaque with a framed white "42" tile is placed inside the frieze every . The walls at the south ends of the platforms are untiled.

The express tracks north of the station spread out to pass around a crossunder in the Times Square shuttle platforms. This crossunder was sealed off in the 1960s.

IRT Broadway–Seventh Avenue Line platforms 

The Times Square–42nd Street station on the IRT Broadway–Seventh Avenue Line is an express station, with four tracks and two island platforms. The 1, 2, and 3 trains stop here at all times. The station serves as the southern terminal of 3 trains during late nights. Stairways to the other lines are provided at the northern end and in the center of each platform; two stairways from each platform lead to the lower mezzanine level while the remainder lead to mezzanines above the platforms. An elevator leads from each platform to the upper mezzanine; the southbound elevator also leads to the lower mezzanine and the Flushing Line platform.

The tunnel is covered by a "U"-shaped trough that contains utility pipes and wires. Each platform consists of  concrete slabs, beneath which are drainage basins. The platforms contain I-beam columns spaced every . Additional columns between the tracks, spaced every , support the jack-arched concrete station roofs. The panels on the trackside walls consist of white square ceramic tiles. A frieze with multicolored geometric patterns runs atop the trackside walls, and a plaque with a stylized "T" is placed inside the frieze at intervals of every three panels.

Just south of the station, a fifth center track begins, formed by a connection from each express track. This track merges back into the two express tracks just before 34th Street–Penn Station. This center track was used in the past for turning rush hour "Gap Trains", which would head back up north. It is currently used for short turning 3 trains during nights.

IND Eighth Avenue Line platforms

The 42nd Street–Port Authority Bus Terminal station on the IND Eighth Avenue Line is an express stop that abuts the Port Authority Bus Terminal. The A and E trains stop here at all times, while the C train stops here at all times except late nights. It has one operational platform level, two offset island platforms, and a long mezzanine. Formerly, it also had a lower level with a single side platform, which could be served by southbound trains from the IND Queens Boulevard Line.

Formerly, escalators led from the mezzanine to the southbound side platform on the lower level, dividing the southbound island platforms. The walls beside each local track contain blue-tile bands with black borders; since 42nd Street is an express station, it has a wider tile band than local stations. The tile colors are intended to help riders identify their station more easily, part of a color-coded tile system for the entire Independent Subway System. At 41st Street, the station crosses over the IRT Flushing Line tunnels; this overpass required  of steel.

Former lower level 
The 42nd Street–Port Authority Bus Terminal station formerly had a lower platform level, with one track underneath the southbound local track and one side platform underneath the southbound island platform. The lower level featured two high-speed escalators to the mezzanine, and three staircases to the southbound island platform. The walls featured 1950s-era cream tiles, a purple and black tile band, and white mosaic name plates with black "42ND ST" text.

Theories differ on why the lower-level platform was built. The platform could only be reached by trains originating from Queens via the IND Queens Boulevard Line, and 53rd Street (the current E service), and a 1930 New York Times article said the platform had always been intended for Queens Boulevard Line service. Reportedly, this would have allowed E trains to load and unload passengers without having to wait for one of the two upper level tracks to clear. When the station was being built, the 42nd Street Property Owners' and Merchants' Association expressed concerns that the double-level station would prevent the Flushing Line from being extended westward. The New York Herald Tribune wrote in 1928: "The construction is such as will enable the engineers to extend the Queensboro subway under and beyond Eighth Avenue in the direction of the 42nd Street ferry if desired".

Film producers have used the lower-level platform for several films, most notably Ghost (1990), starring Patrick Swayze and Demi Moore. By the 2010s, the lower-level platform had been bisected by the extension of the Flushing Line.

IRT Flushing Line platform 

The Times Square–42nd Street station on the IRT Flushing Line has one island platform and two tracks, located deep below West 41st Street. Stairs, escalators, and an elevator along the platform lead to various mezzanines. There are "TS" tile mosaics along the station walls. An office is located at the north (compass east) end of the platform. An elevator connects with the Downtown IRT Seventh Avenue platform and then the mezzanine.

The platform consists of  concrete slabs, beneath which are drainage basins. The platform contains I-beam columns spaced every . Large H-section columns, supporting horizontal I-beams, also support the tall ceilings of the Flushing Line station. Above the escalators, X-supports and diagonally braced lateral beams also support the ceiling. The panels on the trackside walls consist of white square ceramic tiles. A frieze with multicolored geometric patterns runs atop the trackside walls, and a plaque with a framed white "TS" tile is placed inside the frieze every . Similar mosaics run along the bases of the trackside walls as well.

The tracks continue south (compass west) beyond the station to the 34th Street station. These tracks formerly led to a storage and layover area, but the tracks were replaced and inspected as part of the 7 Subway Extension, and new third rail was installed. The closed lower-level platform on the IND Eighth Avenue Line was blocking the line but since removed.

Artwork

Original artwork 
George Lewis Heins and Christopher Grant LaFarge were the first commissioned architects of the IRT. They designed the original Times Square Station, which was located at the current Grand Central Shuttle stop. In many of their stations, Heins and LaFarge use symbolic imagery to honor a neighborhood or its namesake. When Squire Vickers took over as chief designer and architect of the IRT in 1906, he continued this tradition of using symbolism to speak to a station's history.

The colored tile trim of the IRT portions of the station closely resembles the Confederate flag. Scholars believe that Vickers and his colleagues unmistakably reference the symbol of the South to pay homage to New York Times owner Adolph S. Ochs. The Times had built a new headquarters directly above part of the subway station in 1904.  After a 2010s movement in which Confederate monuments nationwide were removed, the Metropolitan Transportation Authority announced in August 2017 that these tiles would be replaced; the tiles were subsequently covered with stickers.

Commissioned artwork 
The station complex contains several artworks commissioned as part of the MTA Arts & Design program. In 1991, Norman B. Colp created The Commuter's Lament or A Close Shave, a series of signs attached to the roof of the 41st Street passageway between Seventh and Eighth Avenues, inspired by classic Burma-Shave ads. In order, the signs read Overslept/So tired/If late/Get fired/Why bother?/Why the pain?/Just go home/Do it again. The last panel is a picture of a bed. The panels were part of an art project that was supposed to last only one year, but were never removed. The MTA also commissioned a mosaic mural by Jack Beal titled The Return of Spring (2001), which is located in the 41st Street passageway. The MTA commissioned a second mural from Beal in 2005, The Onset of Winter. They present the classical myth of Persephone set against the backdrop of the subway.

Jacob Lawrence created a mosaic mural called New York in Transit, which was installed in 2001 above the BMT mezzanine, and depicts several topics related to New York City. New York in Transit was Lawrence's last public work before his 2000 death. Near the BMT mezzanine's connection with the shuttle platform, Roy Lichtenstein created Times Square Mural, which was installed in 2002. Times Square Mural is made from porcelain enamel on steel and measures ; it depicts an elongated car traveling through a subway station. Lichtenstein died in 1997 before the mural could be installed; he had completed Times Square Mural in 1994, but installation was delayed until after the station complex's renovation. The mezzanine between 41st and 42nd Street contains the artwork Times Square Times: 35 Times by Toby Buonagurio, which was installed in 2005. The artwork consists of tiles depicting fashion, performing arts, or streetlife, which are embedded in a glass-brick wall. The mezzanine under the IRT Broadway–Seventh Avenue Line at 41st Street contains a mosaic artwork by Jane Dickson, Revelers. The mosaics depict about 70 life-size people who are moving around in groups.

The 42nd Street–Port Authority Bus Terminal station contains the mosaic artwork Losing My Marbles, which was created by Lisa Dinhofer and installed in 2003. The primary section of the artwork is on a  portion of wall, which depicts marbles overlaid on a black-and-white "floor" with a gold-colored frame; the marbles seem to be rolling in the viewer's direction. The artwork extends onto two additional walls.

The shuttle station contains the artworks Each One, Every One and Equal All, all installed in 2021 and designed by Nick Cave. The mosaic and screens both depict figures in "Soundsuits", sculptural costumes made in a variety of materials. The two other artworks are Each One at the new shuttle entrance and Equal All on the island platform.

References

Notes

Citations

Further reading

External links 

 nycsubway.org – IRT Grand Central/Times Square Shuttle: Times Square
 nycsubway.org – IRT Flushing Line: Times Square
 nycsubway.org – IRT West Side Line: Times Square/42nd Street (text used with permission)
 nycsubway.org – BMT Broadway Subway: Times Square/42nd Street
 nycsubway.org – IND Eighth Avenue Line: 42nd Street/Port Authority Bus Terminal
 MTA's Arts For Transit – 42nd Street–Port Authority Bus Terminal (IND Eighth Avenue Line)

42nd Street (Manhattan)
Articles containing video clips
BMT Broadway Line stations
Broadway (Manhattan)
Eighth Avenue (Manhattan)
IND Eighth Avenue Line stations
IRT 42nd Street Shuttle stations
IRT Broadway–Seventh Avenue Line stations
IRT Flushing Line stations
New York City Subway stations in Manhattan
New York City Subway terminals
New York City Subway transfer stations
Railway and subway stations on the National Register of Historic Places in Manhattan
Seventh Avenue (Manhattan)
Times Square